Paraburkholderia tropica is a species of bacteria in the phylum Pseudomonadota.

References

tropica
Bacteria described in 2004